Masterson may refer to:

Places:
United States:
 Masterson, community, Carson County, Texas
 Masterson, community, Moore County, Texas
 Masterson, community, the original name of the town of Clinton, Vernon County, Wisconsin
 Masterson Lake, reservoir, Tyler County, Texas
 Masterson Lake Dam, dam, Tyler County, Texas
 Masterson Mill, community, Lawrence County, Alabama
 Masterson Mill Lake Dam, dam, Lawrence County, Alabama
 Masterson Oil Field, oilfield, Pecos County, Texas
 Mastersonville, community, Lancaster County, Pennsylvania
 The Masterson Institute For Psychoanalytic Psychotherapy, New York City

Other:
 Masterson (surname)